"Caribbean Moon" (backed with "Take Me To Tahiti") was a Kevin Ayers single, released shortly before his third LP Bananamour. Neither song was featured on the LP but both regularly appeared in his live set at the time. A humorous promotional video was shot for the single; stills from which are featured on the cover.

Track listing
"Caribbean Moon " (Kevin Ayers)
"Take Me To Tahiti"  (Kevin Ayers)

Personnel 
Kevin Ayers / Guitar, Vocals, Bass
Archie Leggett / Bass, Harmony Vocals
Eddie Sparrow / Drums
Keith Bachelor / Flute
Harry Smith / Piccolo
Roy Smith-Field / Piccolo
Schokomomoko / Inspiration of the album

References

Kevin Ayers songs
1973 singles
Songs written by Kevin Ayers
1973 songs